Uryusevo is a rural locality (a village) in Lyakhovskoye Rural Settlement, Melenkovsky District, Vladimir Oblast, Russia. The population was 26 as of 2010. There are 2 streets.

Geography 
Uryusevo is located 18 km southeast of Melenki (the district's administrative centre) by road. Bolshaya Sala is the nearest rural locality.

References 

Rural localities in Melenkovsky District